Hypostomus vermicularis is a species of catfish in the family Loricariidae. It is native to South America, where it reportedly occurs in the coastal drainage basins of eastern Brazil. The species reaches 19 cm (7.5 inches) in standard length and is believed to be a facultative air-breather.

References 

vermicularis
Fish described in 1888